Comilla Zoo and Botanical Garden is a zoo and botanical garden located in the Kaliajhuri area of Comilla, Bangladesh. The zoo has an area of 10.15 acres.

History
In 1986, The Zoo at City's Kaliajhuri in the area of 10.15 acres amid a Botanical garden built, now in a poor condition where different species of animals and birds are dropping off every year. The zoo has seventy five acres of land.

Visitor attractions
Now only sixteen animals and birds are alive there but their condition is relentless, among them a lion, seven
different species monkeys, two bears, two river gulls, two Egyptian hens, a python and a hare.

Opening hours
Everyday 9:00am – 6:00pm.

Gallery

See also
 Tourism in Bangladesh
 List of zoos in Bangladesh
 List of national parks of Bangladesh
 List of protected areas of Bangladesh

References

External links

Zoos in Bangladesh
Botanical gardens in Bangladesh
 
01
Cumilla
Tourist attractions in Bangladesh
Zoos established in 1986